Lindy Boggs Medical Center, formerly known as Mercy Hospital and also known as Lindy Boggs Hospital, is a now-abandoned 187-bed acute care hospital operated by Tenet Healthcare located in Mid-City New Orleans, Louisiana. The hospital provided many services, including emergency care, critical care, and organ transplantation services.

History 
Mercy Hospital was founded in the 1920s.  In the 1990s, Mercy Hospital merged with Southern Baptist Hospital, and the two hospitals operated together as Mercy-Baptist Medical Center.  The hospital was subsequently acquired by Tenet Healthcare and renamed Lindy Boggs Medical Center in honor of Democratic Congresswoman and Ambassador Lindy Boggs, who became the first woman in Louisiana to be elected to the House of Representatives.

Hurricane KATRINA 

When Hurricane Katrina hit New Orleans on August 29, 2005, the hospital was at full census.  Many employees' and patients' families decided to take shelter at the facility as well, thinking that they would be safer and more comfortable.  When the levee system failed on August 30, however, many persons found themselves trapped in the facility with no way out, with no phone service to ask for help, and no TV or radio to get news updates. 19 people died that day. The hospital also had more problems; no running water, no way to dispose of waste, low food storage, and a terrible smell. Many patients, especially those recovering from risky organ transplantation procedures, were not able to be given the medicines they needed most and, since both the power and the generators had failed, were without vital services such as mechanical ventilation and cardiac monitoring. There was no blood for transfusions and very little medication besides morphine. The generators failed 48 hours after Katrina made landfall, causing temperature rises to as high as 105 degrees, and increasing the death risk of the patients, especially those in the intensive care unit. For a while, the staff used hand pumps to blow oxygen into the patients' lungs. A major evacuation effort took place and, thanks to the initiative and hard work of both the hospital staff and the rescue workers, mostly everyone was able to be rescued. The total death toll was 45.

The evacuation divided people into three groups: "C", those that were in critical condition, "B", those that had medical problems but not in critical condition, and "A" for those who could walk on their own. The evacuation method drew much criticism because group A, which consisted of those able to walk normally, was evacuated first and not group C, which consisted of those in critical condition.

Since Hurricane Katrina forced the facility to close, Mid-City New Orleans has been without vital health care services, including an emergency department.

After KATRINA 
After the storm, Tenet Healthcare sold the facility to Georgia-based Victory Real Estate Investments. The same real estate group also purchased neighboring properties with plans for a retail development along Bienville Street but the project never moved forward.

In 2010, the entire Lindy Boggs complex of buildings and a portion of the surface parking was purchased by St. Margaret's Daughters for $4.2 million. St. Margaret's, a Catholic non-profit organization, spent $37 million to renovate more than 100,000 square feet in a former medical office building on the site. A 112-bed nursing facility named "St. Margaret's at Mercy" opened in the renovated space in 2013.

St. Margaret's originally planned to open a cardiovascular hospital in the remaining portion of the medical center. However, a partnership with the State of Louisiana fell through, which made the project financially unfeasible.

Work crews are cleaning asbestos and removing underground storage tanks, with grants from the Environmental Protection Agency and the Louisiana Department of Environmental Quality paying for the work, according to the report. MCC Real Estate, which has a development agreement for the property at 301 N. Jefferson Davis Parkway (now 301 N Norman C Francis Parkway), hasn't finalized a renovation plan but is considering an elderly assisted living facility, the report says.

In August 2017, work began to clean up the undeveloped portions of the property. A grant from the Environmental Protection Agency paid for asbestos removal and the Louisiana Department of Environmental Quality paid for removal of underground storage tanks. Workers also pumped stagnant water out of the building, which had been sitting stagnant since Hurricane Katrina.

There is currently no plan for the hospital's future use, but the idea of an assisted living facility for patients with memory care needs has been discussed. On 8 June 2021, the property was sold to Woodward Design+Build, which plans to bring immediate improvements to the property and its graffiti-covered buildings.

References

Defunct hospitals in Louisiana
Hospitals disestablished in 2005
Healthcare in New Orleans
Tenet Healthcare
Buildings and structures in New Orleans